Deh-e Khazal (also known as Khazal) is a village in Bavaleh Rural District, in the Central District of Sonqor County, Kermanshah Province, Iran. At the 2006 census, its population was 65, in 16 families.

References 

Populated places in Sonqor County